Mirosław Madzia (born 25 October 1979) is a Polish Paralympic athlete who competes in international elite events. He competes in discus throw and shot put and has won four medals in the World Para Athletics European Championships. He competed at the 2016 Summer Paralympics in the discus throw but did not medal.

References

1979 births
Living people
People from Cieszyn County
Paralympic athletes of Poland
Polish male shot putters
Polish male discus throwers
Medalists at the World Para Athletics European Championships
Athletes (track and field) at the 2016 Summer Paralympics
Athletes (track and field) at the 2020 Summer Paralympics
Visually impaired discus throwers
Visually impaired shot putters
Paralympic discus throwers
Paralympic shot putters
21st-century Polish people